Typically Tropical were a British band comprising two Trojan Records audio engineers, Jeff Calvert and Max West. They are best known for their 1975 number one hit record "Barbados" and for writing the 1978 disco hit "I Lost My Heart to a Starship Trooper" by Sarah Brightman and Hot Gossip.

History
After hearing the demo version of "Barbados", recorded in the spring of 1974, David Howell of Gull Records wanted to hear more, but instead Jeff and Max asked for £1500 to finish both "Barbados" and another track they had written, "The Ghost Song", and to record the "Barbados"' B-side, "Sandy". Having agreed, Gull then signed them up for three singles. "Barbados" was finished at the end of 1974, but Gull decided to wait until May 1975 to release it. In August that year it reached number one, and the duo, having performed it on Top of the Pops, decided to write another nine songs for the album Barbados Sky, which was released at the same time as the follow-up single "Rocket Now" (backed with "Hole in the Sky"), and sold around 8000 copies.
 
Opening with "Barbados", the version on the album was slightly different. It began with an additional pre-take-off conversation between Captain Tobias Willcock and Air Traffic Control, whereas the single version begins with the Captain's welcome to his passengers. At the beginning of the single, but not on the album, is the unusual sound of grasshoppers chirruping (which also features at the end of "Rocket Now"), and a dog barking. The album version of the track curtails the single's original ending, fading out earlier.
 
"The Ghost Song" was released as a single in November under the names "Calvert & West" with "Eternity Isle" as the B-side, but as with all their subsequent singles, it did not chart. In May 1976, the third single from the album, "Everybody Plays the Fool", was released.  Further singles were released under a variety of names, but also did not chart. The duo's final original single was "Lady D", released in June 1981 on their own label, Whisper, which they had originally set up to release songs by Sarah Brightman (having written the hit "I Lost My Heart to a Starship Trooper" in 1978). 
 
"Barbados" was later successfully covered by the Vengaboys in 1999 as "We're Going to Ibiza".

Typically Tropical sold 381,456 copies of "Barbados" (as of November 2019) compared to the cover, "We're Going to Ibiza" by the Vengaboys which has sold 1,862,451 (as of November 2019).

Discography

Albums
Barbados Sky (1975)

Singles
"Barbados" / "Sandy" (GULS 14) released 23 May 1975 - AUS #20
"Rocket Now" / "Hole in the Sky" (GULS 19) released 3 October 1975
"Space Walk" / "I'm Only an Elf" (GULS 23) released 31 October 1975 under the artist name "Captain Zero"
"The Ghost Song" / "Eternity Isle" (GULS 24) released 14 November 1975 under the artist name "Calvert & West"
"Everybody Plays the Fool" / "Sylvan's a Barbadian" (GULS 38) released 7 May 1976
"Bridlington" / "Eternity Isle"  (GULS 41) released 9 July 1976 under the artist name "Rollercoaster"
"Jubilee" / "Pretty Baby" (PYE 7N40061) released 24 June 1977
"Barbados" / "In the Stew" (GULS 59) released 26 May 1978
"My Rubber Ball"  / "The Joker"  (HOS 001) released May 1979
"Rockin' in the House of Commons" / "Going to the Country" (EMI 2955) released 18 May 1979 under the artist name "Black Rod"
"Lady "D"" / "Cool Cool Music"  (WSP 103) released June 1981
"Barbados" / "Rocket Now" (OG 9158) released November 1981
"Barbados" / "Rocket Now" (7P 243) released July 1982
"Everybody Plays the Fool" / "Lovers Concerto" (PS 338) date unknown, and presumed to be a Jamaican pressing. Note that "Lovers Concerto" is not Typically Tropical, but a track by The Marvels. This version of "Everybody Plays the Fool" differs from that on the UK single GULS 38.

See also
List of one-hit wonders on the UK Singles Chart
List of artists who reached number one on the UK Singles Chart

References

English pop music duos